The Interfrisian Council is a geopolitical organization that represents the common interests of the Frisians. The organization consists of three regional councils or "sections": North Frisia, East Frisia and West Frisia. Every three years, the presidency of the Interfrisian Council is handed over to another section. The council was established in 1956.

History

The chronicler  wrote in the 17th century that the Frisians had a common language, and that they therefore were also one people.  traveled from (Westerlauwens') Friesland to Saterland and Northern Friesland in the 19th century and recorded the dialects of Frisian on the way. In 1850 Heinrich Ehrentraut from Oldenburg produced a magazine about the Frisian language and history of the Frisian regions. In the 19th century, the Frisian Society in Leeuwarden appointed members of East and North Friesland. Also during this century contacts were particularly strong between West Frisians and North Frisians. Around 1900, the contacts between the Frisian regions became stronger. This interest came mainly from the linguistic angle, .

More contact led to the call for an annual meeting of representatives of the three Frisian territories. , Eeltsje Boates Folkertsma and the association 'The Upstalbeam' (founded in 1924) also called for such meetings. This was the basis for more joint meetings and the founding of the Frisian Council. At the Great Frisian Congress in Husum in 1930 the Frisian Council was established. The aim of the council was to protect and maintain the bond between the congresses.

During World War II, there were no inter-ministerial meetings and the Frisian Council held itself as politically neutral, though was suspicious of both the German and Dutch governments. The Nazis viewed the Frisian Council with suspicion. With the German occupation of the Netherlands in 1940, however, the Nazi state wanted to use the Frisian connections encouraged by the council to draw Dutch Frisians with völkisch ideology to their side.

The next Great Frisian Congress was held in 1952 in Husum and then in 1955 in Aurich. A year later, in 1956, the Frisian Council was officially set up in the East Frisian area of Leer. Under the supervision of the Frisian Council, the collection  was published in 1973. In 1998, the Interfrisian Council was established to act for the three councils / sections of the Frisian Council in the various Frisian regions. A new Interfrisian Declaration was adopted in 2006. In 2006, the German Post (Deutsche Post) issued a commemorative stamp for the 50th anniversary of the Interfrisian Council.

Organization 
Each of the three sections has its own board and administrative center. Section West currently holds the presidency of the Interfrisian Council until 2021.

Sections

Board 
Since the start of Section East's presidency in 2015, the board of the Interfrisian Council consists of:
  Helmut Collmann (president)
  Arno Ulrichs
  Ilse Johanna Christiansen
  Gudrun Fuchs
  Roel Kaastra
  Anton van der Ploeg

References

External links 
 Website of Section North
 interfriesischerrat.de used to be of 'Section East' but is now the same as 'Section North'
 Archive of Section West
 New site of Section West

Frisia
1956 establishments in the Netherlands
Organizations established in 1956